Lode Alphonse Wouters (27 May 1929 – 25 March 2014) was a Belgian cyclist. He was born in Kwaadmechelen, Belgium. He competed for Belgium in the 1948 Summer Olympics held in London, United Kingdom in the individual road race event where he finished in third place.  He also led the Belgian team of Léon Delathouwer and Eugène van Roosbroeck to the gold medal in the team road race. He died in March 2014 in Geel.

References

1929 births
2014 deaths
Belgian male cyclists
Olympic cyclists of Belgium
Olympic gold medalists for Belgium
Olympic bronze medalists for Belgium
Cyclists at the 1948 Summer Olympics
Cyclists from Antwerp
Olympic medalists in cycling
Medalists at the 1948 Summer Olympics
20th-century Belgian people